KSDN-FM (94.1 MHz, "The Rock 94.1 FM") is a radio station licensed to serve Aberdeen, South Dakota.  The station is owned by Prairie Winds Broadcasting, Inc. It airs a mainstream rock music format.

The station was assigned the KSDN-FM call letters by the Federal Communications Commission on September 14, 1978.

Notable on-air personalities include Rusty Rokit (6 am – 10 am), Brent Nathaniel (10 am – 2 pm), Doc Sebastian (2 pm – 7 pm) and Les Cummings (7 pm – midnight). Plus syndicated Dee Snider's House Of Hair & Hard Drive.

94.1 The Rock is the radio home of the Northern State University Wolves.

Ownership, history and programming
In 1997, Roberts Radio of Pleasantville, New York, acquired KSDN and KSDN-FM then, in a separate transaction, acquired KKAA, KKAA-FM, and KQAA-FM. KSDN-FM's studio were moved from the transmitter site on south highway 281 to the KKAA-AM transmitter site 2 miles south of Aberdeen, South Dakota. The station was rebranded from "Rock 94" to its original slogan "94.1 The Rock" and ABC Radio's Classic Rock Experience 24-hour satellite format was added.

In June 2000, Clear Channel purchased Roberts Radio entire assets including the 5 Aberdeen station in a deal valued at a reported $65.9 million. Aberdeen radio stations KKAA (1560 AM), KQAA (94.9 FM), KSDN (930 AM), KSDN (94.1 FM) and KBFO (106.7 FM) were part of that deal. KSDN-FM retained its Classic Rock format.

Late 2004, Aberdeen Radio Ranch’s Rob & Todd Ingstad of Valley City, ND signed an agreement to acquire five Clear Channel-Aberdeen, SD stations: KKAA-AM, KSDN-AM/FM, KBFO-FM, KQAA-FM. In separate transactions, Aberdeen Radio Ranch agreed to convey the assets of three of its stations to other companies, leaving the Ingstads with six area stations KGIM-AM/FM, KBFO-FM, KSDN-AM/FM & KNBZ-FM. Sacramento-based Education Media Foundation picked up KQAA-FM. Oakland-based Family Stations acquired KKAA-AM and KQKD-AM. The studios were relocated from the KKAA-AM transmitter site 2 miles south of Aberdeen to the remodeled original studio location which housed the KSDN-AM/FM transmitter on south highway 281.  ABC Radio's Classic Rock Experience was dropped in favor of local programing.  KSDN-FM's format also changed from Classic rock to Mainstream Rock.

In May 2006, Armada Media Corporation reached an agreement to acquire KBFO, KGIM, KGIM-FM, KNBZ, KSDN, and KSDN-FM from Aberdeen Radio Ranch for a reported $9.25 million.  KSDN-FM maintained its Mainstream Rock format.

On November 1, 2013, Prairie Winds Broadcasting, Inc. reached an agreement to acquire KBFO, KGIM, KGIM-FM, KNBZ, KSDN, and KSDN-FM from Armada Media for $5.3 million.

References

External links
KSDN-FM official website

SDN-FM
Brown County, South Dakota
Classic rock radio stations in the United States
Radio stations established in 1978